American National Carbide is a privately held company that manufactures tungsten carbide products and is headquartered in Tomball, Texas, which is just northwest of Houston.  Also known as "ANC," the company specializes in the production of finished carbide tools for metalworking, rock drilling, and wear applications and is one of a few companies worldwide that is able to recycle tungsten carbide scrap into raw material.  ANC, a member of the United States Cutting Tool Institute, was founded in 1970 and sells its products worldwide.

In June 2012, American National Carbide announced a $2.5 million expansion of its raw material production operation.

Production
American National Carbide products:
 ISO- and ANSI-standard indexable metalworking inserts for turning, milling, threading, grooving, drilling and parting applications
 ISO- and ANSI-standard shims and chipbreakers for metalworking operations
 Unfinished blanks for metalworking inserts and brazed tools
 Inserts for rock drilling and mining, including compacts, nozzles, stabilizers, and hardfacing material
 Cutting and wear products for the primary and secondary wood processing industries
 Specialized cutting tools for brake drum turning, railwheel truing, bar peeling, and small hole boring
 Blended tungsten carbide-cobalt powders for cemented carbide manufacturers and the plasma spray industry

References

External links
 Company website

Manufacturing companies established in 1970
Tool manufacturing companies of the United States
1970 establishments in Texas